The Bowbazaar bomb blast was an explosion which occurred in the central business district of Bowbazar, Calcutta, India on the night of 16 March 1993. In total, it claimed the lives of 69 people.

Background
In 1993, Mohammed Rashid Khan ran gambling establishments in the Bowbazaar area and had a workshop above his office where he made small bombs. He began stockpiling explosives. Preparations were made secretly until, on the night of 16 March, the entire stockpile blew up accidentally. If the blast had occurred in the daytime, the death toll would have been much higher.   According to some witnesses, the sound of the blast could be heard 3 miles away.

Aftermath
Khan and five others were sentenced to life imprisonment in 2001 by the Calcutta High Court under the Terrorist And Disruptive (Prevention) Act (TADA).

See also
1993 Bombay Bombings
2002 attack on American cultural centre in Kolkata

References 

Crime in Kolkata
Terrorist incidents in India in 1993